Gnangdin is a town in the Bittou Department of Boulgou Province in south-eastern Burkina Faso. In 2005, the town had a population of 4,495.

References

Populated places in the Centre-Est Region
Boulgou Province